Reinbek (probably from "Rainbek" = brook at the field margin; Northern Low Saxon: Reinbeek) is a town located in Stormarn district in the northern German state of Schleswig-Holstein within the metropolitan region of Hamburg.  It is accessed by the A1 and the A24 autobahn and federal highway 5.

Reinbek was first mentioned in 1226, the city rights were given in 1952.
The town is located at the river Bille which was dammed up here to form a mill pond.

Religion
Religious affiliation:
 44% Protestant
 9%  Catholic
 22% other religious groups
 26% without religious affiliation

Important church communities
 Church of Mary Magdalene (Lutheran)
 Nathan-Söderblom church (Lutheran)
 Ansgar community, St. Ansgar's Chapel and St. Michael's Chapel (Lutheran)
 Sacred Heart of Jesus (Roman Catholic)
 Evangelical Free Church (Baptist)

Sights

 16th-century castle in Dutch Renaissance style.

Transport
Reinbek station is serviced by the rapid transit system of the Hamburg S-Bahn. Public transport is also provided by buses.

Twin towns – sister cities

Reinbek is twinned with:
 Koło, Poland (1999)

Since 1974, Reinbek also cooperates with Padasjoki in Finland, and has friendly relations with its former twin town of Täby in Sweden.

Notable people
Minna Specht (1879–1961), teacher and socialist
Angela Sommer-Bodenburg (born 1948), children's book author and painter
Sabine Sütterlin-Waack (born 1958), politician
Jan van Aken (born 1961), politician (The Left)
Max Kruse (born 1988), association football player
Maximilian Buhk (born 1992), racing driver

References

External links

Official website

Towns in Schleswig-Holstein
Stormarn (district)